Malaki Lamar Branham (born May 12, 2003) is an American professional basketball player for the San Antonio Spurs of the National Basketball Association (NBA). He played college basketball for the Ohio State Buckeyes.

Early life and high school career
Branham was raised in Columbus, Ohio. Starting in 5th grade, he trained under Jason Dawson in Columbus. He moved to Akron, Ohio where he attended high school at St. Vincent–St. Mary High School. At St. Vincent-St. Mary, he won two state championships in 2018 and 2021. He was named first team All-Ohio in his junior and senior seasons. As a senior, Branham averaged 21.3 points, 5.1 rebounds, 2.7 assists and 1.8 steals per game. In his senior season, he was named Ohio Mr. Basketball and made the Jordan Brand Classic, which was not played due to the COVID-19 pandemic.

Recruiting
Branham was a consensus four-star recruit and ranked as the best player in Ohio. On July 22, 2020, Branham committed to playing college basketball for Ohio State over offers from teams such as Alabama, Baylor, and Iowa.

College career
Branham started his college career off the bench, but quickly became a regular starter. He scored a career-high 35 points in a 87–79 overtime win against Nebraska after a nearly month-long COVID pause. In a three-game stretch in February, he scored 22, 27, and 31 points. As a freshman, he averaged 13.7 points, 3.6 rebounds and two assists per game. Branham was named Big Ten Freshman of the Year as well as Third Team All-Big Ten. On April 1, 2022, Branham declared for the 2022 NBA draft while maintaining his college eligibility. He later signed with an agent, forgoing his remaining eligibility. He was projected as a potential lottery pick in the draft.

Professional career

San Antonio Spurs (2022–present)
Branham was selected with the 20th overall pick by the San Antonio Spurs in the 2022 NBA draft. Branham joined the Spurs' 2022 NBA Summer League team. In his Summer League debut, Branham scored fifteen points in a 99-90 loss to the Cleveland Cavaliers. On July 8, 2022, Branham signed a rookie-scale contract with the Spurs.

Career statistics

College

|-
| style="text-align:left;"| 2021–22
| style="text-align:left;"| Ohio State
| 32 || 31 || 29.6 || .498 || .416 || .833 || 3.6 || 2.0 || .7 || .3 || 13.7

References

External links

Ohio State Buckeyes bio

2003 births
Living people
21st-century African-American sportspeople
African-American basketball players
American men's basketball players
Austin Spurs players
Basketball players from Columbus, Ohio
Ohio State Buckeyes men's basketball players
San Antonio Spurs draft picks
San Antonio Spurs players
Shooting guards
Small forwards